Oncidium baueri is a species of orchid native to Costa Rica and to South America as far south as Bolivia and Brazil.

References

External links
IOSPE orchid photos Oncidium baueri
Blog da Bete, Orquideas, Oncidium baueri
Projecto Orchidstudium, photos of Oncidium baueri 
Ecuagenera, Orquídeas del Ecuador, Oncidium baueri

baueri
Orchids of Central America
Orchids of South America
Orchids of Brazil
Orchids of Costa Rica
Orchids of Venezuela